The Asahi Top Position was a Go competition.

Outline
The final of the Top Position tournament would be a best of five with 10 hours of thinking time. There was no komi, unless the match had to be played out all 5 games, which then would be played with a 4.5 komi. The preliminaries also had no komi. This tournament ran from 1955 to 1961 and was subsequently replaced by the Meijin and Judan titles. The sponsor was Asahi shimbun.

Past Winners & Runner-up's

Go competitions in Japan